Mas'ade is a Druze village in the northern Golan Heights. It was given the status of a local council in 1982. Its inhabitants are mostly Syrian citizens and have permanent residency in Israel. Since the adoption of the 1981 Golan Heights Law, Mas'ade is under Israeli civil law, and is incorporated into the Israeli system of local councils. 
 
Mas'ade is one of the four remaining Druze-Syrian communities on the Israeli-occupied side of the Golan Heights and on Mount Hermon, together with Majdal Shams, Ein Qiniyye and Buq'ata. Geographically a distinction is made between the Golan Heights and Mount Hermon, the boundary being marked by the Sa'ar Stream; however, administratively they are usually lumped together. Mas'ade and Buq'ata are on the Golan side of the boundary and are characterized by black volcanic rock (basalt), while Majdal Shams and Ein Qiniyye are on the Hermon side, thus sitting on limestone.
 
Near Mas'ade are Lake Ram and Odem Forest.

Mas'ade is located at the intersection of Route 99, which leads west to Kiryat Shmona, and Route 98, which leads north to Mount Hermon and south to the Kinneret (Sea of Galilee/Lake Tiberias).

References 

Towns in Quneitra Governorate
Local councils in Northern District (Israel)
Druze communities in Syria
Quneitra District